Wayne Denis Hall (AM) is Inaugural Professor and Director of the Centre for Youth Substance Abuse Research at the University of Queensland.  He was formerly an NHMRC Australia Fellow at the University of Queensland Centre for Clinical Research (2010-2013), Professor of Public Health Policy in the School of Population Health (2005–2010) and Director of the Office of Public Policy and Ethics at Institute for Molecular Biosciences (2001–2005), at the University of Queensland. He is also a Fellow of the Academy of the Social Sciences in Australia. He has written widely on the ethical and policy issues associated with the genetics and neurobiology of addiction, mental disorders and cancer.

Wayne Hall was the Director of the National Drug and Alcohol Research Centre at the University of NSW during 1994 to 2001.  Since 1993, Wayne Hall has made large contribution in the field of public health in the area of drug use, addiction, treatment, ethics, and research as World Health Organization's expert adviser.  As a "Highly Cited Author" identified by the Institute for Scientific Analysis, he is dedicated to public health research with other authors such as Lucke J, Degenhardt L, Chapman S, and Gartner C.  Professor Wayne Hall is currently working as a NHMRC Australia Fellow on addiction neuroethics (see www.addiction-neuroethics.com) and his research interests include alcohol and drug research and education, cancer prevention, epidemiology, health policy, mental health, pharmacoeconomics and policy, and tobacco control.

In 2014 Hall published a review that examined the adverse effects of cannabis. This review included studies from the previous 20 years. He concluded that driving while cannabis-impaired approximately doubles the risk of a car crash. He also concluded that when used regularly in adolescence the risk of school-leaving and "of cognitive impairment and psychoses in adulthood" was doubled. The review reported that about 1 in 11 (9%) of regular marijuana users develop dependence. Hall told LiveScience that "The perception that cannabis is a safe drug is a mistaken reaction to a past history of exaggeration of its health risks."

Hall was elected Fellow of the Australian Academy of Health and Medical Sciences (FAHMS) in 2015.

References

1951 births
Living people
Members of the Order of Australia
Cannabis researchers
Academic staff of the University of Queensland
Fellows of the Academy of the Social Sciences in Australia
Fellows of the Australian Academy of Health and Medical Sciences